The following is a partial list of Recorded Texas Historic Landmarks (RTHLs) arranged by county as designated by the Texas Historical Commission and local county historical commissions in Texas. This page includes RTHLs in the following counties: Trinity, Tyler, Upshur, Upton, Uvalde, Val Verde, Van Zandt, Victoria, Walker, Waller, Ward, Washington, Webb, Wharton, Wheeler, Wichita, Wilbarger, Willacy, Williamson, Wilson, Winkler, Wise, Wood, Yoakum, Young, Zapata, and Zavala.

KEY

Landmarks with multiple historic designations are colored according to their highest designation within the following hierarchy.

Trinity County

Tyler County

Upshur County

Upton County

Uvalde County

Val Verde County

Van Zandt County

Victoria County

Walker County

Waller County

Ward County

Washington County

Webb County

Wharton County

Wheeler County

Wichita County

Wilbarger County

Willacy County

Williamson County

Wilson County

Winkler County

Wise County

Wood County

Yoakum County

Young County

Zapata County

Zavala County
There are currently no Recorded Texas Historic Landmarks listed within the county.

See also

References

External links

 (Trinity-Zavala)
Landmarks (Trinity-Zavala)